

Anchors

Primary
1954–1959: Larry Henderson
1959–1966: Earl Cameron
1966–1969: Stanley Burke
1969–1970: Warren Davis
1970–1976: Lloyd Robertson
1976–1978: Peter Kent
1978–1988: Knowlton Nash
1988–1992: Peter Mansbridge
1992–1995: Alison Smith 
1995–2017: Peter Mansbridge
2017–2020: Adrienne Arsenault, Rosemary Barton, Andrew Chang, Ian Hanomansing
2020–present: Adrienne Arsenault and Andrew Chang

Weekend/Fill-in
 Jan Tennant (1974–1982)
 George McLean (1978–1983)
 Peter Mansbridge (1984–1988)
 Knowlton Nash (1988–1992)
 Alison Smith (1990–1992, 2005)
 Brian Stewart (1992–2009)
 Adrienne Arsenault (1998–2017
 Carole MacNeil (2004–2009)
 Evan Solomon (2004–2009)
 Jacquie Perrin (–2009)
 Diana Swain (2005–present)
 Amanda Lang (2009–2015)
 Wendy Mesley (2009–2020) (Regular host Fridays and Sundays)
 Kim Brunhuber (2009–present)
 David Common
 Ian Hanomansing (2020–present) (Regular host Fridays and Sundays)
 Heather Hiscox 
 Mark Kelley
 Asha Tomlinson (2021-present) (guest anchor)

Reporters

Current

 Sandra Abma, National Arts Reporter
 Adrienne Arsenault, London, England
 Nahlah Ayed, Montreal (2002–Present)
 Keith Boag (1983–Present)
 Kim Brunhuber, Toronto
 David Common
 Kelly Crowe
 Gillian Findlay, Toronto (1978–Present)
 Mellissa Fung, Toronto (2003–Present)
 Rob Gordon (1992–Present)
 Havard Gould
 Ian Hanomansing, Vancouver (1986–Present)
 Paul Hunter
 Mark Kelley (1995–Present)
 Amanda Lang, Toronto (2009–2015)
 Neil Macdonald, Washington, D.C. (1988–Present)
 Duncan McCue, Vancouver (1992–Present)
 Wendy Mesley, Toronto (1985–Present)
 Rex Murphy, Toronto (1994–Present)
 Susan Ormiston, Toronto (1977–1991, 2001–Present)
 Saša Petricic, Ottawa (1993–Present)
 Reg Sherren, Winnipeg (2000–Present)
 Julie Van Dusen (1988–Present)

Former
 Claude Adams (1988–1991)
 Paul Adams
 Rosemary Barton
 Chris Brown
 Laurie Brown
 Patrick Brown (1980–2008)
 Lynda Calvert
 Bill Cameron
 Ron Charles
 Michelle Cheung
 Natalie Clancy
 Marisa Dragani
 Carolyn Dunn
 Robert Fisher (1978–1988)
 John Fitzgibbon
 Laurie Graham
 David Halton
 Tom Harrington
 Michael Hornbrook
 Der Hoi–Yin (1985–1995)
 Tom Kennedy (1976–2001)
 Fred Langan (1969–2009)
 John Main
 Peter Mansbridge (1975–1988)
 Claire Martin, Vancouver (2005–2014)
 Terry Matte (1971–1997)
 Margo McDiarmid
 Terry Milewski (1980–2007)
 Tom Murphy
 Don Murray
 Steve Paikin (1988–1992)
 Lynne Robson
 Eve Savory (1981–2008)
 Joe Schlesinger (1966–1994)
 Alison Smith (1989, 1996–2009)
 Eric Sorensen (1992–2006)
 Brian Stewart (1971–1985, 1987–2009)
 Kevin Tibbles
 Judy Waytiuk (1979–1987)
 Karen Webb
 Nancy Wood
 Paul Workman (1982–2006)

Commentators

Current
 Bob McDonald is the newscast's science commentator.
 Gwynne Dyer appears occasionally, commenting on world and military affairs.
 Rex Murphy contributes a weekly commentary on a segment entitled "Point of View", which runs just before the end of the broadcast. (1994–Present)
 A political panel titled "At Issue" airs weekly except during the summer. The regular panelists are columnists Andrew Coyne and Chantal Hébert from Maclean's and the Toronto Star respectively, and Allan Gregg, of Decima Research.

Former
 Keith Boag (1999-2009)

References

CBC News